Antisemitism in universities has taken place in many countries at various times. Antisemitism has been manifested in various policies and practices, such as restricting the admission of Jewish students by a Jewish quota, or ostracism, intimidation or violence against Jewish students, as well as in the hiring, retention and treatment of Jewish staff. In some instances, universities have supported antisemitic government or social policies and condoned the development of antisemitic cultures on campus. In many jurisdictions, especially since World War II, discriminatory practices, including within the context of a university, are in breach of anti-discrimination laws, though antisemitic cultural values still persists on many campuses.

In recent years, accusations of antisemitism have sometimes been made in relation to the activities of cultural leftist or pro-Palestinian organizations on university campuses. These accusations are controversial and have almost always been rejected by the organizations in question.

20th century

Canada
Historian Gerald Tulchinsky has written that Canadian universities were "rife with antisemitism" in the early 20th century. Some universities restricted Jewish admission, Jews were banned from many fraternities and sororities, and many Jewish medical students were unable to find placements in Canada after graduation. (Despite this, Tulchinsky has also written that Canadian universities were "not hotbeds of antisemitism" in general and, indeed, that they played a significant role in the development of a Canadian Jewish culture.)

McGill University and the University of Toronto
McGill University imposed strict maximum quotas on Jewish students in 1920. Before the quotas were introduced, Jewish students represented 25% of arts students and 40% of law students. These rates fell significantly in the following years.

McGill continued to impose a 10% maximum quota on Jewish medical students until the 1960s; it was sometimes noted that the francophone Université de Montréal, unlike McGill, did not restrict Jewish admission after World War II. The University of Toronto's medical school also required higher marks of Jewish students until the 1960s, and Toronto's Jewish Mount Sinai Hospital was denied status as a teaching hospital until 1962.

Queen's University
In 1912, despite strong protests from Canada's Jewish community, the Government of Ontario approved a new constitution for Queen's University that included a phrase affirming that "the trustees shall satisfy themselves of the Christian character of those appointed to the teaching staff." In 1919, newly appointed principal R. Bruce Taylor made antisemitic statements at a meeting of university alumni, saying that "[t]he presence of many Jews tended to lower the tone of Canadian Universities." At least one graduate protested against this statement to the university's chancellor. Notwithstanding these developments, Tulchinsky has written that Queen's was "mildly more liberal" than McGill and the University of Toronto in accepting Jewish students and hiring Jewish faculty. Unlike the other universities, Queen's admitted German Jewish refugees as students in the 1930s and 1940s.

Germany
In April 1933, Nazi Germany passed laws barring Jews from holding any official positions, including teaching at universities. Historian Gerald Holton describes how, with "virtually no audible protest being raised by their colleagues", thousands of Jewish scientists were suddenly forced to give up their university positions and their names were removed from the rolls of institutions where they were employed.

Hungary
Moshe Y. Herczl has written that universities were part of a larger phenomenon of antisemitism that took place in Hungary after World War I. Christian university students, sometimes joined by their professors, took part in violent demonstrations against Jewish student enrollment during the autumn of 1919. The authorities were forced to temporarily close the universities as a result of the disruption. Shortly thereafter, the Hungarian government prepared a law limiting Jewish enrollment to about 6% of the total university population.

Several departments at Peter Pazmany Catholic University in Budapest supported the proposed quota, as did the administration at the Technical University of Budapest. Some professors called for Jews to be banned from Hungarian universities entirely. After some debate, the Hungarian parliament passed the quota legislation by a vote of 57–7. It came into effect at the beginning of the 1920 academic year, coinciding with another round of antisemitic rioting on campuses. The number of Jews in Hungarian academic institutions fell dramatically in this period; at the University of Budapest, the numbers declined from 4,288 in 1917–18 to only 459 in 1920–21. Several European Jewish organizations opposed the Hungary quota law, arguing that it created a precedent that would be followed by other governments.

Antisemitic rioting continued at Hungarian universities into the 1930s; Jewish students were ostracized and often physically attacked. Christian student associations introduced a petition in 1933 that called for a strict enforcement of government quotas, while other groups passed antisemitic manifestos. The disruption once again led to a temporary closing of the universities.

Further antisemitic legislation was passed by the Hungarian parliament in 1939, on the eve of World War II. Among many other things, this legislation further restricted Jewish enrollment in universities.

Accusations related to the Israel-Palestinian conflict

Evidence of antisemitic incidents on university campuses across North America, Europe, and Australia since 2000 have been recorded by a number of sources. Though the circumstances surrounding the reported incidents are disputed, some maintain that campus activism supportive of the Palestinians and critical of Israel has created an atmosphere of anti-Jewish intimidation that erupts periodically in hate speech and even violence. Others acknowledge that antisemitic incidents have occurred, but dispute the extent of them, and contend that commentators have conflated political anger with ethnic or religious hatred in an attempt to chill legitimate debate.

Australia
In Australia, Daniel Wyner of the Australasian Union of Jewish Students, says that the "vilification we feel as students on campus ... [is] coming almost entirely from the left." Grahame Leonard, president of the Executive Council of Australian Jewry, says July 2006 had the most antisemitic incidents since records began in 1945, and that many of the incidents were on campus. In Sydney, some Jewish students have started to wear hats over their kippahs. Deon Kamien, former Victorian president of the Union of Jewish Students, told The Age: "It's not something I can put in words. A lot of students who would feel very comfortable wearing a kippah or T-shirt with Hebrew words on it now feel they are being targeted as Jews — not supporters of Israel, but Jews. When they walk past socialist stalls (on campus) they are called f---ing Jews."

Canada
In September 2002, then-former Israeli prime minister Binyamin Netanyahu was prevented from delivering a speech at Concordia University in Montreal after a student protest turned violent. Some protesters harassed the predominantly Jewish audience that had arrived for the speech, and there were reports of Holocaust survivors being assaulted. Figures such as World Jewish Congress secretary Avi Beker described the incident as indicative of an "anti-Semitic campaign" on North American campuses, while journalist Lysiane Gagnon accused the university's pro-Palestinian students union of "refus[ing] to blame those who broke windows, threw chairs around, spat at and shoved the Jewish students who wanted to hear Mr. Netanyahu". The student union's vice-president of communications rejected Gagnon's charge, saying that his organization had on many occasions "publicly condemned any acts of physical violence [...] especially those acts that were antisemitic or anti-Arab in nature." A representative of Concordia's Solidarity for Palestinian Human Rights organization claimed that only a small minority of protesters had engaged in violent acts and argued that the protest itself was justified.

The author Rick Salutin argues that accusations of a "new anti-Semitism" in contemporary Canada are usually unspecific, and do not include verifiable names or quotations. He has also written that incidents of "name calling and group hate" at protests are not indicative of a new wave of antisemitism, which is universally regarded as unacceptable within mainstream Canadian discourse.

France
In France, Patrick Klugman, President of the Union of French Jewish Students (UEJF), wrote in Le Figaro in 2003: "On some university campuses like Nanterre, Villetaneuse and Jussieu, the climate has become very difficult for Jews. In the name of the Palestinian cause, they are castigated as if they were Israeli soldiers! We hear 'death to the Jews' during demonstrations which are supposed to defend the Palestinian cause. Last April, our office was the target of a Molotov cocktail. As a condition for condemning this attack, the lecturers demanded that the UEJF declare a principled position against Israel!"

United Kingdom
In the UK, the "Report of the All-Party Parliamentary Inquiry into Anti-Semitism" in 2006 reported that "when left wing or pro-Palestinian discourse is manipulated and used as a vehicle for anti-Jewish language and themes, the anti-Semitism is harder to recognize and define ..." The report describes how "tensions and incidents on campus often peak around students' union votes concerning Israel and Zionism," listing by way of example several incidents precipitated by a 2002 University of Manchester students' union motion to declare that anti-Zionism was not antisemitism, and that Israeli goods should be boycotted. During the voting phase, according to the Jewish Representative Council of Greater Manchester, a leaflet from the General Union of Palestinian Students quoting a neo-Nazi forgery entitled "Prophecy of Benjamin Franklin in Regard of the Jewish Race", was handed out to students lining up to vote. The leaflet described Jews as vampires, and said that if they were not expelled from the United States, they would "enslave the country and destroy its economy." When the motion was defeated, a brick was thrown through the window of one Jewish student residence while a poster with the words "Slaughter the Jews" was stuck to its front door, and a knife was stuck in the door of another.

In October, 2020, UK Education secretary Gavin Williamson sent a letter to vice-chancellors at English universities, accusing the universities of ignoring antisemitism.

United States

A survey published in February 2015 by Trinity College and the Louis D. Brandeis Center for Human Rights under Law found that 54% of the participants had been subject to or witnessed antisemitism on their campus. The survey had a 10-12% response rate, does not claim to be representative, and included 1,157 self-identified Jewish students at 55 campuses nationwide. The most significant origin for antisemitism, according to the survey was "from an individual student" (29%). Other origins were: In clubs/societies, in lecture/class, in student union, etc.

However, a 2017 report from Brandeis University's Steinhardt Social Research Institute indicated that most Jewish students never experience anti-Jewish remarks or physical attacks. The study, "Limits to Hostility," notes that though often reported in the news, actual antisemitic hostility remains rare on most campuses.
The study attempts to document student experience at the campus level, adding more detailed information to national-level surveys like the 2015 Trinity College Anti-semitism report. The report summary highlights that, though antisemitism does exist on campus, "Jewish students do not think their campus is hostile to Jews" across the campuses surveyed.

In September 2021, in collaboration with the Cohen Group, the Brandeis Center conducted a poll of American Jewish fraternity and sorority members. The survey found that more than 65% of the respondents had experienced or were familiar with an antisemitic attack in the previous 120 days. Nearly half of the respondents felt the need to hide their Jewish identity out of fear.

In 2022 several student groups at the University of Berkeley's School of Law banned inviting speakers who support Zionism or the State of Israel, citing concern for "the safety and welfare of Palestinian students on campus."

Duke University
Duke's chapter of Students Supporting Israel (SSI), an international pro-Israel movement, was denied recognition by the Duke Student Government (DSG) in November 2021. The incident attracted national media attention, and Duke SSI was officially recognized as a student organization in February 2022 after the student government reconsidered the group's application.

The sitting DSG president vetoed the recognition of Duke SSI in November 2021 five days after the group was recognized by the DSG Senate due to Duke SSI's social media response to claims of "promoting colonialism." This veto was upheld in a meeting by the Senate just two days later.

The incident garnered attention from a variety of individuals, outlets, and organizations. Duke President Vincent E. Price and Provost Sally Kornbluth issued a statement reiterating the university's commitment to equity. Other organizations such as The Louis D. Brandeis Center for Human Rights Under Law and the Zionist Organization of America, advocated on behalf of SSI after Duke's chapter of Students for Justice in Palestine (SJP) challenged SSI's existence.  The Brandeis Center sent a letter to President Price alleging that the derecognition of Duke SSI constituted discrimination against a Jewish student organization.

DSG ultimately recognized SSI as a student organization on February 23, 2022.

See also
Academic boycott of Israel
Campus Watch
Ghetto benches
Jewish quota

Notes

Further reading
Scholars for Peace in the Middle East
Beckwith, Leila; Bejamin, Ilan; Benjamin, Tammi; Rosenberg, Moshe. SPME Report: Report of the meeting of SPME Faculty Representatives from three University of California campuses with head of the UC Academic Senate on addressing antisemitism and anti-Israelism, Scholars for Peace in the Middle East, February 16, 2007.

Disabilities (Jewish)
New antisemitism
Education controversies